Leonel Duarte Plat, (born 1 August 1987) is a Cuban retired footballer.

Club career
Duarte played his entire career for his provincial side Ciego de Ávila, except for a season in Germany with amateur side SV Einheit 1875 Worbis.

International career
He made his international debut for Cuba in a July 2005 CONCACAF Gold Cup match against the United States and has earned a total of 40 caps, scoring 6 goals. He represented his country in 7 FIFA World Cup qualification matches (1 goal) and played at 2 CONCACAF Gold Cup final tournaments.

His final international was a December 2010 Gold Cup qualification match against Grenada.

International goals
Scores and results list Cuba's goal tally first.

References

External links
 

1987 births
Living people
People from Ciego de Ávila
Association football forwards
Cuban footballers
Cuba international footballers
FC Ciego de Ávila players
2005 CONCACAF Gold Cup players
2007 CONCACAF Gold Cup players
Cuban expatriate footballers
Expatriate footballers in Germany
Cuban expatriate sportspeople in Germany